Kang-min is a Korean masculine given name. Its meaning differs based on the hanja used to write each syllable of the name. There are 28 hanja with the reading "kang" and 27 hanja with the reading "min" on the South Korean government's official list of hanja which may be registered for use in given names.

People with this name include:
 Kim Kang-min (baseball) (born 1982), South Korean baseball player
 Lee Kang-min (born 1985), South Korean football player
 Lee Kang-min (actor) (born 1990), South Korean actor
 Kim Kang-min (actor) (born 1998), South Korean actor

See also
List of Korean given names

References

Korean masculine given names